Nur Felek Qadin (died 15 August 1916), was a consort of Isma'il Pasha of Egypt.

Nur Felek Qadin married Isma'il Pasha, and gave birth to Prince Hussein Kamel Pasha on 21 November 1853. Isma'il was deposed in 1879, and was succeededby his son Tewfik Pasha. She was widowed at Isma'il's death in 1895.

On the 19 December 1914 the British Government declared Khedive Abbas Hilmi Pasha deposed, and proclaimed Prince Hussein Kamel Pasha as Sultan of Egypt. As a result Nur Felek became the Walida Sultan, literally "mother of the sultan".

Nur Felek died at the Mamure Palace, Alexandria on Tuesday 15 August 1916, and was buried at Imam-i Shafi'i next day at 4 p.m.

References

1916 deaths
Egyptian concubines
Egyptian slaves
Nur Felek